The Battle of Pateros refers to a series of skirmishes between Spanish troops and revolutionary forces in the towns of Las Piñas, Taguig and Pateros in Manila. These skirmishes occurred shortly after the execution of José Rizal and are considered the renewal of hostilities in Luzon after a period of ceasefire from the Battle of Binakayan to the Rizal execution.

Background 

After the failed Spanish attempt to recapture several towns in Cavite, a short period of desperate fighting occurred. The central Luzon revolutionaries in the north were heavily depleted and were on the verge of losing their war. Andrés Bonifacio's men in Morong were hard pressed by the Spaniards. But as things began to settle, the revolutionaries had successfully liberated all of Cavite and most of Laguna, Batangas and Tayabas provinces. In the period following the battle at Binakayan, several townsfolk from all over the provinces raced to settle in the territory of Cavite, bringing with them their town bands, their patron saints and so on. This period of temporary peace saw what the settlers of Cavite called "Ang Panahon ng Tagalog". Meanwhile, a new governor, Camilo de Polavieja, was put in power and began to suppress the rebels in Cavite, with Manila newspapers reporting the arrival of 40,000 cazadores (marksmen) from Spain.

Advance on Pateros 
Strategically located along the Pasig River, Pateros and other cities in the area were ideal for controlling trade in and out of Laguna, as Emilio Aguinaldo slowly advanced on Taguig, the generals of Laguna planned to liberate the rest of the province as well.
Just before these incidents, an unofficial ceasefire was being observed in Cavite. Upon hearing of the execution of Rizal, Aguinaldo and several other generals ordered for the renewed struggle for independence. The first major target for the revolutionaries was Pateros and its surrounding towns. The advance began on land with the Aguinaldo forces marching towards Pateros, after noticing rebel activities in the area, Spanish troops pleaded for reinforcements as Aguinaldo moved forward, the reinforcements would arrive one day too late.

First Battle 

On December 31, Aguinaldo engaged the Spanish loyalist garrison at Pateros, catching them completely by surprise, meanwhile, Mariano Noriel and Pio del Pilar advanced on Taguig, Silang and Las Piñas. By nightfall of the 31st, Pateros, Taguig and Silang were under rebel control.

Spanish reinforcements arrive 
Starting on January 1 until January 2, a large contingency of Spanish troops from Laguna arrived and soon forced Aguinaldo to order tactical withdrawal out of Pateros and Noriel, out of Taguig. Spanish troops began to probe rebel activities in Pateros, while the revolutionary forces shifted their attention to Las Piñas.

Skirmishes 
On January 3,  rebels skirmished with Spanish fortified strongholds put up by Governor-general Ramon Blanco in Las Piñas, Perez Dasmariñas and Silang in an attempt to disrupt Spanish forces, by the afternoon of the 3rd, Rebels forces retreated back from Pateros and Las Piñas and into Laguna and Cavite.

Aftermath 
Though successful in the initial part of the battle, the Filipinos took crippling losses in this battle, and with such loss, this meant that they are not going to hold their positions near Manila for long. They retreated in the nearby provinces to avoid further rout by the Spanish. For the latter, their victory in the battle meant that the road to the Katipunan faction of Magdalo's capital of Imus is now open for the taking. To grasp the opportunity, the Spanish general Jose de Lachambre ordered quick assault on Cavite province to finally pacify the rebels there and retake the province for the Spanish Crown.

References 

Conflicts in 1896
Conflicts in 1897
1896 in the Philippines
1897 in the Philippines
Battles involving Spain
Pateros
History of Metro Manila
December 1896 events
January 1897 events
Battles of the Philippine Revolution